Group B of the 1994 Federation Cup Americas Zone was one of four pools in the Americas zone of the 1994 Federation Cup. Four teams competed in a round robin competition, with the top three teams advancing to the knockout stage.

Chile vs. Trinidad and Tobago

Jamaica vs. Bahamas

Chile vs. Bahamas

Ecuador vs. Jamaica

Ecuador vs. Trinidad and Tobago

Chile vs. Ecuador

Trinidad and Tobago vs. Bahamas

Ecuador vs. Bahamas

See also
Fed Cup structure

References

External links
 Fed Cup website

1994 Federation Cup Americas Zone